Ian Dunt (born 4 February 1982) is a British author, political journalist and broadcaster.  He currently writes as a columnist for the 'i'.  He previously served for many years as the Editor of politics.co.uk.  He was also a host on the Remainiacs podcast.

Early life 
Dunt was born in Winchester and grew up in Chile  and the UK (Winchester and Southampton). Dunt holds a Bachelor's degree in Philosophy (2004) from University College London, a Master's in International Relations (2006) from University of Warwick and a Diploma in Journalism and Media Law (2008) from the London School of Journalism.

Career 
Dunt began his career as a journalist for PinkNews. He then switched to political analysis for Yahoo!, before becoming Political Editor of Erotic Review, a position he held until January 2010, when he became editor of politics.co.uk. He regularly appears on TV, commenting on political developments in the United Kingdom.

In May 2017, Dunt was part of the team that launched Remainiacs, a political podcast about Britain's departure from the European Union, as seen from a pro-Remain perspective. In January 2020 the same team launched The Bunker, a podcast similar in format that discusses political issues other than Brexit.  In October 2020, Remainiacs was renamed as Oh God, What Now?

Bibliography 

 Brexit: What the Hell Happens Now? (2016) Canbury Press
 How To Be A Liberal (September 2020) Canbury Press

References 

British political journalists
Alumni of University College London
Alumni of the University of Warwick
Alumni of the London School of Journalism
Living people
British podcasters
1982 births